The grey-naped antpitta (Grallaria griseonucha) is a species of bird in the family Grallariidae. It is endemic to Venezuela.

Its natural habitat is subtropical or tropical moist montane forest.

References

grey-naped antpitta
Birds of the Venezuelan Andes
Endemic birds of Venezuela
grey-naped antpitta
grey-naped antpitta
grey-naped antpitta
Taxonomy articles created by Polbot